Naval stores are all liquid products derived from conifers.  These materials include rosin, tall oil, pine oil, and terpentine.  The term naval stores originally applied to the organic compounds used in building and maintaining wooden sailing ships, a category which includes cordage, mask, turpentine, rosin, pitch and tar.These materials were originally used for water- and weather-proofing wooden ships. Presently, they are used to manufacture soap, paint, varnish, shoe polish, lubricants, linoleum, and roofing materials.

History
Ships made of wood required a flexible material, insoluble in water, to seal the spaces between planks.  Pine pitch was often mixed with fibers like hemp to caulk spaces which might otherwise leak.  Crude gum or oleoresin can be collected from the wounds of living pine trees.

Colonial North America
The Royal Navy relied heavily upon naval stores from American colonies, and naval stores were an essential part of the colonial economy. Masts came from the large white pines of New England, while pitch came from the longleaf pine forests of Carolina, which also produced sawn lumber, shake shingles, and staves.

Naval stores played a role during the American Revolutionary War. As Britain attempted to cripple French and Spanish capacities through blockade, they declared naval stores to be contraband. At the time Russia was Europe's chief producer of naval stores, leading to the seizure of 'neutral' Russian vessels. In 1780 Catherine the Great announced that her navy would be used against anyone interfering with neutral trade, and she gathered together European neutrals in the League of Armed Neutrality.  These actions were beneficial for the struggling colonists as the British were forced to act with greater caution.

The major producers of naval stores in the 19th and 20th century were the United States of America, and France, where Napoleon encouraged planting of pines in areas of sand dunes. In the 1920s the United States exported eleven million gallons of spirits. By 1927, France exported about 20 percent of the world's resin.

Separation techniques

Naval stores are recovered from the tall oil byproduct stream of Kraft process pulping of pines in the United States. Tapping of living pines remains common in other parts of the world.  Turpentine and pine oil may be recovered by steam distillation of oleoresin or by destructive distillation of pine wood; solvent extraction of shredded stumps and roots has become more common with the availability of inexpensive naphtha.  Rosin remains in the still after turpentine and water have boiled off.

See also
Shipbuilding
Naval stores industry
Bark hack

Footnotes

External links
https://web.archive.org/web/20101009032732/http://www.srs.fs.usda.gov/organization/history/naval_stores.htm
http://www.maritime.org/conf/conf-kaye-tar.htm
http://www.fao.org/documents/show_cdr.asp?url_file=/docrep/V6460E/v6460e04.htm
http://www.hchsonline.org/places/turpentine.html
https://web.archive.org/web/20070928044420/http://www.unctv.org/exploringNC/episode308.html

Resins
Shipbuilding
Timber industry
History of forestry
Non-timber forest products